Brookfield Township is one of the twenty-four townships of Trumbull County, Ohio, United States.  The 2000 census found 10,020 people in the township, 9,921 of whom lived in the unincorporated portions of the township.

Geography
Located in the Southeastern part of the county, it borders the following townships and city:
Hartford Township - north
South Pymatuning Township, Mercer County, Pennsylvania - northeast
Hubbard Township - south
Liberty Township - southwest corner
Sharon, Pennsylvania - east
Vienna Township - west
Fowler Township - northwest corner

The village of Yankee Lake is located in northern Brookfield Township, along with three census-designated places:
Brookfield Center, in the center
Part of Masury, in the southeast
West Hill, in the east

Name and history
Statewide, the only other Brookfield Township is located in Noble County.

Government
The township is governed by a three-member board of trustees, who are elected in November of odd-numbered years to a four-year term beginning on the following January 1. Two are elected in the year after the presidential election and one is elected in the year before it. There is also an elected township fiscal officer, who serves a four-year term beginning on April 1 of the year after the election, which is held in November of the year before the presidential election. Vacancies in the fiscal officership or on the board of trustees are filled by the remaining trustees.

Brookfield has a public library, a branch of the Warren-Trumbull County Public Library.

Education
Public education in the township is managed by Brookfield Local School District, which operates three schools:
Brookfield Elementary School
Brookfield Middle School
Brookfield High School
All three schools are housed in a K-12 complex that held its first classes during the 2011–2012 academic year. As of the 2016–2017 academic year, 1,000 pupils attend the school district with a student-teacher ratio of 17:1.

Attractions
Brookfield is home to Yankee Run Golf Course, voted one of the top courses in Ohio and given a 4 star rating by Golf Digest in 2001.
Another attraction is Yankee Lake Truck Night.

Media

Television
The township is served by WKBN-TV (CBS), WFMJ-TV (NBC), WYTV (ABC), WYFX-LD (Fox) and WBCB (CW), all broadcast from nearby Youngstown, OH.

Radio
The township is served by several AM radio stations, such as WLOA (1470 AM) (Farrell, PA), WPIC (790 AM) (Sharon, PA), WKBN (570 AM) (Youngstown, OH), and by several FM radio stations such as WYFM/"Y-103" (102.9 FM) (Yankee Lake, OH), WLLF/"The River" (96.7 FM) (Mercer, PA), WYLE/"Willie 95.1" (95.1 FM) (Grove City, PA), WMXY/"Mix 98.9" (98.9 FM) (Youngstown, OH) and WWIZ/"Z-104" (West Middlesex, PA), because of Brookfield's unique position along the Pennsylvania/Ohio border..

Print
Brookfield Township is served by News on the Green, a monthly publication that focuses Brookfield, Yankee Lake, and Masury, The Herald (Sharon, PA), The Vindicator (Youngstown, OH), and the Tribune Chronicle (Youngstown, OH).

References

External links
Trumbull County website
Brookfield Township website
Brookfield Local Schools website
Brookfield Police Department website
Brookfield Fire Department website
Brookfield Township Historical Society website
Brookfield Branch Library of the Warren-Trumbull County Public Library website

Townships in Trumbull County, Ohio
Townships in Ohio